Trudi Trueit is an American author of children's books.

Her work includes a series books for Scholastic Press and National Geographic Kids.

Personal life 

Trudi Trueit is an American author, known for her children's fiction and nonfiction titles including the EXPLORER ACADEMY series (National Geographic). Her love for writing started in fourth grade, and she wrote and directed her first play at that her school. She was one of those kids that always had her head in a book. She graduated summa cum laude from Pacific Lutheran University in Tacoma.

Career 
Trueit jobs were Trueit Media, president and chief executive officer. Formerly worked as a television news reporter, weather forecaster, journalist, media specialist, and news anchor but after being a reporter she knew her calling was in writing. Her Hobbies and other interests were drawing, painting, photography.

References 

1963 births
Living people
Writers from Seattle
American children's writers
American women children's writers
21st-century American women